Meek's Cutoff may refer to:

 Meek Cutoff, a wagon trail of the 19th century
 Meek's Cutoff (film), a 2010 film telling the story of the party blazing the trail